John Castelli, known as Costello (15 May 1890 – 24 June 1915) was an English professional footballer who played in the Football League for Glossop as a right back.

Personal life 
Costello worked as a warehouseman. On 30 September 1914, a month after the outbreak of the First World War, he enlisted in the Plymouth Battalion, Royal Naval Division of the Royal Marine Light Infantry. He held the rank of sergeant and was shot in the right ankle at Gallipoli on 12 June 1915. Evacuated to the hospital ship , Costello died of wounds on 24 June 1915. He is commemorated on the Plymouth Naval Memorial.

Career statistics

References

1890 births
1915 deaths
Footballers from Manchester
People from Blackley
English footballers
English Football League players
Association football fullbacks
Altrincham F.C. players
Rochdale A.F.C. players
Royal Marines personnel of World War I
Royal Marines ranks
British military personnel killed in World War I
Stockport County F.C. players
Glossop North End A.F.C. players
63rd (Royal Naval) Division soldiers
English people of Italian descent
Military personnel from Lancashire